James Broomfield Middlemass (7 February 1920 – 5 July 1998) was a Scottish footballer who played for Kilmarnock. Middlemass appeared in the 1952 Scottish League Cup Final, which Kilmarnock lost 2–0 to Dundee.

References

1920 births
1998 deaths
Footballers from Glasgow
Scottish footballers
Association football wing halves
Petershill F.C. players
Kilmarnock F.C. players
Scottish Football League players
Scottish Junior Football Association players